The LSU–Texas A&M football rivalry is an American college football rivalry between the LSU Tigers and Texas A&M Aggies.

History
The majority of the pre-2012 games were non-conference; there was a five-game stretch from 1906 to 1914 when they were opponents in the Southern Intercollegiate Athletic Association (SIAA).

LSU has wins in the two bowl games where they were opponents: the 1944 Orange Bowl in Miami and 2011 Cotton Bowl Classic in Arlington. From 1945 to 1973, LSU went 17–3–1 against A&M. The schools have split the last six games, with the home team winning in each instance.

Pre-SIAA/SIAA
The teams first played at College Station in 1899. A&M won 52–0. It was the only game before they joined the SIAA.

They did not meet again until 1906 in Baton Rouge, the first of five games between 1906 and 1914 in which they were opponents in the SIAA. They played two more times in 1913 and 1914. A&M went 3–1–1. After 1914, A&M left to join the newly formed Southwest Conference (LSU participated in initial meetings to form it, but chose not to join.)

SEC vs. SWC
They played two neutral-site games in 1916 and 1917 before four straight games from 1920 to 1923. Between 1916 and 1923, A&M went 3–2–1. The series resumed from 1942 to 1949 in the regular season. In addition to the regular season game in 1943, they met in the first bowl game of the rivalry. LSU won the January 1, 1944 Orange Bowl 19–14. LSU went 7–2, winning the last five.

They met again in 1955 and 1956, with A&M taking both games. They were led by John David Crow, their first Heisman Trophy winner. They played annually from 1960 to 1975, with all games in Baton Rouge to allow A&M to earn a larger gate than it would have realized by hosting the Tigers in College Station. This was the longest consecutive games played between the two teams in the series history. LSU went 12–3–1. After 1961, LSU took the lead in the series; LSU still leads the series today. A&M's 1970 win had a 79-yard touchdown pass with 13 seconds left to upset LSU (who would win the SEC title). A&M did not win another game that year and finished 2-9.

The series resumed from 1986 to 1995 as a home-and-home (Baton Rouge in even-numbered years, College Station in odd-numbered years). A&M went 6–4, winning the last five, including blowouts of 45-7 in 1991 and 24-0 in 1993. Four of those five were over LSU head coach Curley Hallman, a starting defensive back on the Aggies' 1967 Southwest Conference championship team and Aggie assistant coach from 1982-87. R. C. Slocum, a native Louisianian, was A&M's head coach for the last seven meetings in that 10-year series.

SEC vs. Big 12
They did not meet again until January 7, 2011, in the Cotton Bowl Classic. It was the only meeting during the Aggies' tenure in the Big 12 Conference, and the second time in a bowl game. In 2011, the Cotton Bowl celebrated its 75th Anniversary and this was the first Cotton Bowl Classic to be played in prime time in the highly anticipated match-up. LSU beat Texas A&M in the Cotton Bowl 41–24 at Arlington, Texas.

SEC
The series resumed in 2012, and for the first time since the SIAA days they would be conference opponents, when A&M joined the SEC and was placed in the West Division with LSU.

In 2012, A&M's Johnny Manziel won the Heisman. LSU's defense caused him to have his worst performance of the year, which included 0 touchdowns and 3 interceptions. #6 LSU won 24–19 at College Station in the first SEC game. In 2013, #22 LSU won 34–10, A&M's first SEC road loss.

Prior to the 2014 season, the Southeastern Conference rearranged LSU's schedule, moving its traditional year-end game vs. Arkansas to earlier in November, and placing Texas A&M at the end of the Tigers' slate. The Aggies' fellow SEC newcomer, Missouri, is now Arkansas' opponent for the regular season finale. 

In 2014, they played on Thanksgiving night for the first time in the series history. The last time LSU played on Thanksgiving was 1973. LSU won 23–17 in College Station.

Prior to the 2015 meeting, rumors swirled that LSU coach Les Miles would be fired following the game and replaced by then-Florida State coach Jimbo Fisher. Following the Tigers' 19–7 victory at home, LSU athletic director Joe Alleva announced Miles would be retained. However, Miles was fired on September 25, 2016, hours after LSU lost 18–13 at Auburn. Les Miles was 5-0 vs Texas A&M. Defensive line coach Ed Orgeron was named as LSU's interim head coach.

Heading into the 2016 meeting on Thanksgiving at College Station, it was reported Alleva would name then-University of Houston coach Tom Herman as Miles' permanent successor. Alleva changed course after LSU won 54–39, giving Orgeron the job full-time less than 48 hours later.

The rivalry was ratcheted up a notch in 2018 when the Aggies hired former LSU offensive coordinator Jimbo Fisher as head coach, luring him from Florida State with a 10-year, $75 million contract. Fisher was on Nick Saban's staff in 2003 when LSU won the first of its three national championships of the 21st century, and later led the Seminoles to the 2013 national title. 

In 2018, Texas A&M beat LSU 74–72 at Kyle Field for their first win over the Tigers since 1995. This set an NCAA FBS record for most points scored in a single game and tied an NCAA record for playing in 7 overtime periods.

LSU exacted revenge in the 2019 meeting at Baton Rouge, beating the Aggies 50–7 to wrap up an undefeated regular season. The Tigers went on to win their fourth national championship, defeating Oklahoma 63–28 at the Peach Bowl in the semifinals and Clemson 42–25 in the championship game. However, Texas A&M won 20–7 in Kyle Field in 2020. In 2021, LSU upset Texas A&M 27-24 to become bowl eligible, in coach Ed Orgeron's final game at LSU. Then, a year later, in 2022, the Aggies returned the favor, later upsetting LSU, who entered the game as the number 5 team in the nation, by a score of 38-23. Despite the win, A&M finished the season 5-7, making it the first losing season since 2009, and therefore making A&M inelgible for a bowl game for the first time since 2008.

Game results

References

College football rivalries in the United States
LSU Tigers football
Texas A&M Aggies football